Under Wraps was the third studio album from Shaun Cassidy, released in 1978. Less successful commercially than its two predecessors, Under Wraps was an early indication that Cassidy's popularity was beginning to lose momentum, as the album barely cracked the top 40 on the US Billboard charts, peaking at #33, and scoring no major hit singles.  "Our Night" peaked at #80 on the US Hot 100.

The album features the song "It's Like Heaven", which was co-written by founding Beach Boys member Brian Wilson, along with Rocky Pamplin and Diane Rovell. This would mean Wilson would have contributed musically to an album by both Cassidy brothers, as he also co-wrote the song "Cruisin' to Harlem" on the album Getting It in the Street by David Cassidy, Shaun Cassidy's half-brother.

Track listing
"Hard Love" (Shaun Cassidy)
"Taxi Dancer" (Shaun Cassidy)
"Lie to Me" (Bill LaBounty, Jay Senter)
"One More Night of Your Love" (Erich Bulling, Roger Atkins)
"It's Like Heaven" (Rocky Pamplin, Brian Wilson, Diane Rovell)
"Our Night" (Bruce Roberts, Carole Bayer Sager)
"She's Right" (Shaun Cassidy)
"Midnight Sun" (Peter McCann)
"Right Before Your Skies" (Shaun Cassidy)

Personnel
Shaun Cassidy - vocals, guitar, keyboards
Ben Benay, Davey Johnstone, Jay Graydon, Joey Newman, John Morell, Michael Lloyd - guitar
Dee Murray, Dennis Belfield, Jim Hughart - bass
Greg Mathieson, Jim Greenspoon, Michael Lang, Tom Hensley, Michael Lloyd - keyboards
Carlos Vega - drums
Alan Estes - percussion
John D'Andrea - saxophone
Bill Champlin, Bobby Kimball, Carmen Twillie, Gene Merlino, Jackie Ward, Jim Haas, Melissa Mackay, Myrna Matthews, Ron Hicklin, Sally Stevens, Tom Kelly, Vennette Gloud - background vocals
Humberto Gatica - remix

Charts

References

Shaun Cassidy albums
1978 albums
Warner Records albums